Linda Ogugua (born 12 April 1978) is a Nigerian women's basketball Center. Ogugua attended Biola University in California, United States and played with the Nigeria women's national basketball team at the 2004 Summer Olympics.

Personal
Ogugua was born to Caroline Chinwe and John Brown Ogugua in Anambra State, Nigeria in April 1978.

References

1978 births
Living people
Biola University alumni
Nigerian women's basketball players
Olympic basketball players of Nigeria
Basketball players at the 2004 Summer Olympics
Centers (basketball)
Sportspeople from Anambra State